Bolon Nature Reserve (also Bolon'sky) is the oldest Russian 'zapovednik' (strict ecological reserve) in the Russian Far East. It is located on the Middle Amur River lowlands adjacent to the south-west of Lake Bolon. The reserve covers the wetlands of international importance. Large numbers of migratory waterfowl use the area for nesting and stopovers on long flights. The reserve is situated half way between the city of Khabarovsk and Komsomolsk-on-Amur, in the Amursky District of Khabarovsk Krai.

Topography
The Bolon Reserve covers 100,000 hectares south of Lake Bolon, a terrain of meandering streams of the estuaries of the Selgon River and Simmy River flowing into the lake.   The reserve covers a portion of the southern lake shore.  The Amur River runs southwest to northeast about 50 km from the reserve.  Anyuysky National Park is across the Amur from the Bolon Reserve.

Climate and Ecoregion
Bolon is located in the Ussuri broadleaf and mixed forests ecoregion.  This ecoregion os of the Ussuri River region in the middle Amur River basin on the west slope of the Sikhote-Alin Mountains.  The Ussuri ecoregion is characterized by mixed broadleaf species such as Manchurian ash and Japanese elm in the lowlands, and Korean pine and broadleaf forests in the middle elevations.

The climate of Bolon is Humid continental climate, cool summer (Köppen climate classification  (Dwb) ). This climate is characterized by high variation in temperature, both daily and seasonally; with dry winters and cool summers.

Flora and fauna 
Swamps occupy 80% of the territory.  The plant life of the reserve is accordingly aquatic and wetland-associated.   On the lower terraces are reed-sedge and herb-sedge.   Meadows are reed grass and reed grass-forb.  Scientists on the reserve have recorded 348 species of vascular plants in 92 families.

Around Lake Bolon on the plain are the summer feeding grounds for elk and deer; they migrate from the nearby mountain ridges for calving and rearing.  Typical other mammals are the brown bear, badger, and raccoon dog.

Spring and autumn migrations bring an estimated 1.2 million to the reserve.  Over 200 species have been recorded, including the Far Eastern stork, Steller's sea eagle, and snipe-spoon-billed sandpiper.  The reserve also hosts the Japanese crane at the northern edge of its range.

Ecoeducation and access
As a strict nature reserve, the Bolon Reserve is mostly closed to the general public, although scientists and those with 'environmental education' purposes can make arrangements with park management for visits.   It is possible for the public to arrange for guided tours on the eco-route "Avian Crossroads" during the migration periods - April 20 to May 15 in the spring, and September 15 to October 20 in the fall.  Applications must be made in advance with payment of fees; the route can be arranged for visit on foot or small boat.  The excursion takes 6-8 hours, and there is a bird observation deck on the lake.  The reserve's office is in the village of Dzhuen.  Recently, the reserve has opened an ethnographic museum dedicated to the Nanai people in the village.

See also 
 List of Russian Nature Reserves (class 1a 'zapovedniks')
 National parks of Russia
 Protected areas of Russia

References

External links
  Map of Bolon Reserve, OpenStreetMap
  Map of Bolon Reserve, ProtectedPlanet 

Nature reserves in Russia
1997 establishments in Russia
Protected areas established in 1997
Ramsar sites in Russia
Geography of Khabarovsk Krai
Zapovednik